Baldi is an Italian surname. Notable people with the surname include:

Bernardino Baldi (1533–1617), Italian mathematician and writer
Camillo Baldi (bishop) (died 1650), Roman Catholic Bishop of Nicotera 
Domenico Di Cecco di Baldi (active mid-15th century), Italian painter
Pier Maria Baldi (1630-1686), Italian painter and architect
Pietro Del Riccio Baldi (1475-1507), also known as Crinitus, Florentine humanist scholar and poet, disciple of Poliziano
Aleandro Baldi (born 1959), Italian  singer-songwriter and composer
Antonio Baldi (born 1692), Italian painter and engraver
Antonio Pompa-Baldi (born 1974), Italian-American pianist.
Baldo Baldi (1888–1961), Italian fencer
Camillo Baldi (1550–1637), Italian doctor, philosopher and social commentator from Bologna
Daniel Baldi (born 1981), Uruguayan football player and writer
Dario Baldi (born 1976),  Italian film director, documentarian and writer
Edgardo Baldi (born 1944), former Uruguayan football player and manager
Ferdinando Baldi (1927–2007), Italian film director, producer and screenwriter
Filippo Baldi Rossi (born 1991), Italian professional basketball player
Gastone Baldi (1901-1971), Italian footballer who played as a midfielder
Gian Vittorio Baldi (1930–2015), Italian film director, producer and screenwriter
João José Baldi (1780-1816), pianist at the court of the Marquis of Alorna and opera conductor in Leiria
Lazzaro Baldi (c. 1624–1703), Italian painter from Pistoia
Marcello Baldi (1923–2008), Italian film director and screenwriter
Mauro Baldi (born 1954), Italian former Formula One driver
Paulo Baldi, American percussionist with the band CAKE
Philip Baldi, American linguist and classical scholar
Pierre Baldi, Italian-born computer scientist
Ubaldesco Baldi (1944-1991), Italian sport shooter
Valentino Baldi (1774-1816), Italian painter, mainly of quadratura and ornamentation in fresco and tempera

 Notable people with the given name include
Baldi Niederkorfer (or Balthasar Niederkofler; 1906-1989), Austrian cross country skier

See also 
Baldini
Baldi's Basics in Education and Learning

Italian-language surnames